Phyllonorycter aberrans is a moth of the family Gracillariidae. It is known Ohio, Florida, Kentucky, Missouri, Arkansas, South Carolina and Tennessee in the United States.

The larvae feed on Desmodium species, including Desmodium canescens and Desmodium paniculatum. They mine the leaves of their host plant. The mine has the form of a white blotch mine, with a loosened epidermis which is very thin and almost pure white, on the upperside of the leaf

References

External links
 

aberrans
Moths described in 1930
Moths of North America

Lepidoptera of the United States
Taxa named by Annette Frances Braun
Leaf miners